The 1958 Titleholders Championship was contested from March 13–16 at Augusta Country Club. It was the 19th edition of the Titleholders Championship.

This event was won by Beverly Hanson.

Final leaderboard

External links
The Milwaukee Sentinel source
The Milwaukee Journal source

Titleholders Championship
Golf in Georgia (U.S. state)
Titleholders Championship
Titleholders Championship
Titleholders Championship
Titleholders Championship
Women's sports in Georgia (U.S. state)